Johnsville may refer to any of the following locations in the United States:

Johnsville, Arkansas
Johnsville, California
Johnsville, Kentucky
Johnsville, Maryland
Johnsville Naval Air Development Center, officially NAWC, Aircraft Division, Warminster, a former research and development facility for the United States Navy
Johnsville, a former place-name in New York; now East Fishkill
Johnsville, Ohio
Johnsville, Pennsylvania, now Warminster Township, Bucks County, Pennsylvania